The Tactusina are a subtribe of moths of the family Erebidae. The clade was described by Michael Fibiger in 2010.

Taxonomy
The subtribe was originally described as the subfamily Tactusinae of the family Micronoctuidae.

Clades (former tribes) and genera
Tactusa clade
Tactusa Fibiger, 2010
Conspica Fibiger, 2010
Tumula Fibiger, 2010
Dignius Fibiger, 2011
Vas Fibiger, 2010
Nilgerides Fibiger, 2010
Fustius Fibiger, 2011
Bruma Fibiger, 2010
Costasensora Fibiger, 2010
Longiantrum Fibiger, 2010
Obscurior clade
Abes Fibiger, 2010
Asyprocessa Fibiger, 2010
Tantulius Fibiger, 2010
Asylemissa Fibiger, 2010
Clarior Fibiger, 2010
Obscurior Fibiger, 2011
Editum Fibiger, 2010
Asytegumen Fibiger, 2010
Dextella Fibiger, 2011
Paradoxica Fibiger, 2011
Dorsum Fibiger, 2011

References

Micronoctuini
Lepidoptera subtribes